Schizolaena pectinata is a tree in the family Sarcolaenaceae. It is endemic to Madagascar.

Description
The small flowers are white or pink. The involucre of the flowers is fleshy and laciniate. It is thought to attract lemurs, bats and birds who in turn disperse the tree's seeds.

Distribution and habitat
Schizolaena pectinata is known only from the eastern regions of Vatovavy-Fitovinany, Alaotra-Mangoro and Atsinanana. Its habitat is humid and subhumid forests from sea-level to  altitude.

Threats
Two subpopulations of the species are in the protected areas of Betampona Integral Natural Reserve and Perinet-Analamazaotra Special Reserve. Outside of these areas, the species is threatened by shifting patterns of agriculture.

References

pectinata
Endemic flora of Madagascar
Trees of Madagascar
Plants described in 1963
Taxa named by René Paul Raymond Capuron